The chapters of the manga Black Cat were written and illustrated by Kentaro Yabuki and published by Shueisha in Weekly Shōnen Jump from 2000 to 2004. Black Cats plot follows Train Heartnet, a former assassin known as the Black Cat, who now lives as a bounty hunter, dubbed "Sweeper".

The manga's 185 chapters were collected in 20 tankōbon volumes that were published from January 6, 2001 to October 4, 2004 by Shueisha. It was licensed in English in North America by Viz Media as they first announced it in the 2005 San Diego Comic-Con International. The twenty volumes were published from March 7, 2006 to May 5, 2009 under Viz's Shonen Jump label. Madman Entertainment published Viz's English release in Australia and New Zealand. Black Cat was also adapted into a 24-episode anime series with the same name by Gonzo. Directed by Shin Itagaki, the anime aired in Japan from October 6, 2005 to March 30, 2006.


Volume list

See also 
 List of Black Cat characters
 List of Black Cat episodes

References 

Black Cat